is a railway station in the town of Tōhoku in Aomori Prefecture, Japan, operated by the third sector railway operator Aoimori Railway Company.

Lines
Ottomo Station is served by the Aoimori Railway Line, and is 64.3 kilometers from the terminus of the line at Aomori Station. It is 681.6 kilometers from Tokyo Station.

Station layout
Ottomo Station has two ground-level island platforms  connected by a footbridge; however, one side of each platform is not in use. The station is staffed.

Platforms

Bus services
Towada Kanko bus stop
For Shichinohe

History
Ottomo Station was opened on January 1, 1894 as a station on the Nippon Railway. On January 1, 1906, with the nationalization of the Nippon Railway, it became a station of the Tōhoku Main Line of the Japanese Government Railways (JGR), the pre-war predecessor to the Japan National Railways (JNR). Regularly scheduled freight services were discontinued from March 15, 1972. With the privatization of the JNR on April 1, 1987, it came under the operational control of East Japan Railway Company (JR East).

The section of the Tōhoku Main Line including this station was transferred to Aoimori Railway on December 4, 2010.

Surrounding area
Tohoku town office
Ottomo Post Office

See also
 List of Railway Stations in Japan

References
 JTB Timetable December 2010 issue

External links
 Aoimori Railway station information page 

Railway stations in Aomori Prefecture
Railway stations in Japan opened in 1894
Tōhoku, Aomori
Aoimori Railway Line